OneEurope is a non-profit and independent grassroots think-tank, established in 2011, which aims to give opportunities to citizens to raise topics and communicate between nations and cultures. OneEurope is managed solely by volunteers. It has been built up by hundreds of young Europeans from across Europe.  It is independent from national and local governments, from the European Union, and from political parties, institutions, agencies and all other political and business bodies.

References

External links
 

Eurofederalism
Pan-Europeanism
German educational websites
2011 establishments in Europe